The 2010–11 ACB season is the 28th season of the Liga ACB. The regular season started on September 30, 2010 and ended on May 15, 2011. Playoffs started on May 19, 2011 and ended on June 14. Regal FC Barcelona won their 16th title.

Promotion and relegation 
Teams promoted from 2009–2010 LEB
 CAI Zaragoza
 ViveMenorca

Teams relegated to 2010–2011 LEB Oro
 Xacobeo Blu:Sens
 CB Murcia

Team information 
Last updated: 1 October 2010

Stadia and locations

Head coaches 

1Coach Manuel Hussein was sacked after the day 6. Chechu Mulero was the coach in the game 7.
2Óscar Quintana was sacked after the day 8.
3Aíto Gª Reneses and Trifón Poch, sacked after the day 17.
4He took the team after Ettore Messina renouncing.

Team Standings 

Italics indicate holder of a Euroleague Basketball (company) "A License", giving the team automatic access to the 2011–12 Euroleague regardless of league position.

Playoffs

Stats Leaders

Points

Rebounds

Assists

Awards

Regular season MVP 
 Fernando San Emeterio - Caja Laboral

All-ACB team

Best Coach 
 Xavi Pascual - Regal FC Barcelona

ACB Rising Star Award 
 Gustavo Ayón – Baloncesto Fuenlabrada

MVP Week by Week

Player of the month 
{| class="wikitable sortable" style="text-align: center;"
! align="center"|Month
! align="center"|Week
! align="center"|Player
! align="center"|Team
! align="center"|Efficiency
! align="center"|Source
|-
|October||1–5||align="left"| Carlos Suárez||Real Madrid||22.4|| 
|-
|November||6–9||align="left"| Stanko Barać||Caja Laboral||24.5|| 
|-
|December||10–13||align="left"| Victor Claver||Power Electronics Valencia||18.8|| 
|-
|January||14–19||align="left"| Carl English||DKV Joventut||27.2|| 
|-
|February||20–22||align="left"| Nik Caner-Medley||Asefa Estudiantes||26.7|| 
|-
|March||22–27||align="left"| Nik Caner-Medley||Asefa Estudiantes||22.4|| 
|-
|April||27–31||align="left"| Nik Caner-Medley||Asefa Estudiantes||23.7|| 
|-
|May||32–34||align="left"| Jaycee Carroll||Gran Canaria 2014||23||

References

External links 
 ACB.com 
 linguasport.com 

 
Liga ACB seasons
 
Spain